Bangall Post Office is a historic post office building located at Bangall, Dutchess County, New York. It was built in 1915, and is a small one-story, rectangular frame building sheathed in clapboard. The front facade features a one-story, almost full-width porch with shed roof. The building is owned by the Stanford Historical Society and leased by the United States Postal Service.

It was added to the National Register of Historic Places in 2014.

See also
National Register of Historic Places listings in Dutchess County, New York

References 

Post office buildings on the National Register of Historic Places in New York (state)
Government buildings completed in 1915
Buildings and structures in Dutchess County, New York
National Register of Historic Places in Dutchess County, New York